Eupithecia despectaria is a moth in the  family Geometridae. It is found in Russia (the South Siberian Mountains) and Kazakhstan.

References

Moths described in 1853
despectaria
Moths of Asia